Dmitri Kulikov (born 23 September 1977) is an Estonian football referee and a former footballer, who played as defender and midfielder for Estonian Meistriliiga club FC Kuressaare and Latvian Virsliga club FK Jaunība Rīga.

References

External links
 Kulikov in action for Saaremaa, against Shetland in 2005 (photo)
 
 

1977 births
Living people
Estonian footballers
Estonia international footballers
Estonian people of Russian descent
FC Puuma Tallinn players
FC Norma Tallinn players
FC Lantana Tallinn players
FC Kuressaare players
FCI Levadia Tallinn players
Estonian expatriate footballers
Estonian expatriate sportspeople in Latvia
Expatriate footballers in Latvia
Estonian football referees
Association football defenders
Association football midfielders
Meistriliiga players